Yñigo, Íñigo, or Inigo Ortiz de Retez (fl. 1545) was a 16th-century Spanish maritime explorer of Basque origin, who navigated the northern coastline of the Pacific–Melanesian island of New Guinea and is credited with bestowing its current name.

Life

Early life
Yñigo Ortiz de Retez was born in Retes de Llanteno (Alava, Spain) in a non-titled nobility family (hidalgos) in the first decade of the 16th century. The first accounts we have of him are as part of Alvarado's expedition of 1538 to take the governorship of Guatemala and Honduras. He participated in the expedition to relieve the siege of Nochistlán in 1541 during the Mixtón war, led by Alvarado.

Villalobos Expedition

In 1542, he was appointed to the expedition of López de Villalobos to the Islas de Poniente (Philippines). Upon his arrival in Mindanao on February 1543, Ortiz de Retes was promoted to Maestre de Campo.

After the unsuccessful attempt of Bernardo de la Torre in 1543 to return to Mexico along a northern route, López de Villalobos commissioned Ortiz de Retez for the same mission but going south. Many islands were encountered and first charted, along the northern coast of New Guinea, and in the Padaidos, Le Maires, Ninigos, Kaniets and Hermits, to some of which Spanish names were given.

On 20 June, 1545, at the mouth of the Mamberamo river (that was charted as San Agustin), he took possession of the land for the Spanish Crown, in the process giving the island the name by which it is known today. He called it  or  owing to the supposed resemblance of the local inhabitants to the peoples of the Guinea coast in West Africa.

The main source for Retez's voyage is that of Garcia de Escalante Alvarado, who was part of the Villalobos expedition, and who, after his return to Spain, wrote a chronicle that he sent to Antonio de Mendoza, viceroy of New Spain.

Ortiz de Retez was later imprisoned by the Portuguese in the Moluccas along with the remaining members of Villalobos's expedition. According to Escalante, he was one of the 117 who were later repatriated by the Portuguese in 1548.

References

Explorers of New Guinea
Spanish explorers
Spanish explorers of the Pacific
16th-century Spanish people
16th-century explorers
People of New Spain
Spanish East Indies